Hey Babe!, also known as Babe! and also known as Rise and Shine, is a 1980 film, a musical drama starring Yasmine Bleeth and Buddy Hackett.  This was Yasmine's first film at the age of 12 years.

Plot
Theresa O'Brian is a 12-year-old orphan who desperately wants to attend a school for the performing arts and become a star.  She is not receiving encouragement at the orphanage and is getting into trouble with the orphanage officials due to her infractions of the rules and regulations.

In one of her unauthorized adventures away from the orphanage, she meets and befriends Sammy Cohen who was a Vaudeville performer who became an alcoholic and lost his career. He is interested in renewing his career and has faith in Theresa's ability, and together they develop an act called "Buddy and Babe" in order to raise money for Theresa's tuition.

Cast
Buddy Hackett as Sammy (Cohen)
Yasmine Bleeth as Theresa (O'Brian)
Maruska Stankova as Miss Wolf
Vlasta Vrana as Roy
Denise Proulx as Miss Dolphine
Tara Lee Bell as Sandy
Saundra Baly as Kate
Geraldine Hunt as TV Singer
Gordie Brown as Jean

Shot in 1979, the film was released in 1983, by which time the film's "TV Singer" Geraldine Hunt had scored a 1980 Billboard National Disco Action Top 100 number-one hit with "Can't Fake the Feeling".

Production credits
Rafal Zielinski (Director)
Edith Rey (Writer)	
Arthur Veronka	(Producer)

External links
 
 

1980 films
English-language Canadian films
Films directed by Rafal Zielinski
Canadian musical drama films
1980s musical drama films
Films about orphans
Films about music and musicians
1980 drama films
1980s English-language films
1980s Canadian films